Marius Falquy (born 13 March 1946) is a French biathlete. He competed in the relay event at the 1976 Winter Olympics.

References

1946 births
Living people
French male biathletes
Olympic biathletes of France
Biathletes at the 1976 Winter Olympics
Place of birth missing (living people)